Elena Curtoni (born 3 February 1991) is an Italian World Cup alpine ski racer.

Her sister Irene Curtoni is also a former World Cup racer.

Biography
Born in Morbegno, Sondrio, Lombardy, she has competed for Italy in five World Championships. 
Curtoni made her World Cup debut in November 2009 at age 18 and gained her first podium in March 2016; her first win was in a downhill at Bansko in January 2020, leading an Italian podium sweep with teammates Marta Bassino and Federica Brignone.

World Cup results

Season standings

Race podiums
 3 wins – (2 DH, 1 SG)
 12 podiums – (5 DH, 7 SG)

World Championship results

Olympic results

See also
Italian female skiers most successful World Cup race winner

References

External links
 
 
 Elena Curtoni at Italian Winter Sports Federation (FISI) 
 Elena Curtoni at Head Skis

1991 births
Italian female alpine skiers
Living people
Alpine skiers of Gruppo Sportivo Esercito
Sportspeople from the Province of Sondrio
Alpine skiers at the 2022 Winter Olympics
Olympic alpine skiers of Italy